Primocerus is a Neotropical genus of water scavenger beetle in the family Hydrophilidae represented by nine described species known from the Guiana Shield Region.

Taxonomy 
The genus Primocerus was described for the first time by Girón & Short in 2019.

It belongs in the subfamily Acidocerinae and contains nine described species from Brazil (Pará), Guyana, Suriname, and Venezuela.

Description 
Small to medium-sized beetles (2.4–4.9 mm), smooth and shiny dorsally, orange-brown, reddish brown, or dark brown in coloration, with moderately long maxillary palps. The elytral punctation ranges from shallow to strongly marked, forming impressed serial striae; all the species bear a well defined sutural stria. A complete diagnosis was presented by Girón and Short.

Habitat 
According to Girón and Short, "The habitats occupied by members of Primocerus range from forested pools to seepages".

Species 

 Primocerus cuspidis Girón and Short, 2019
 Primocerus gigas Girón and Short, 2019
 Primocerus maipure Girón and Short, 2019
 Primocerus neutrum Girón and Short, 2019
 Primocerus ocellatus Girón and Short, 2019
 Primocerus petilus Girón and Short, 2019
 Primocerus pijiguaense Girón and Short, 2019
 Primocerus semipubescens Girón and Short, 2019
 Primocerus striatolatus Girón and Short, 2019

References 

Hydrophilidae
Insects of South America
Insects described in 2019